The Alternative Forces for Renewal and Emergence (FARE) is a political party in Mali led by Soumana Mory Coulibaly.

History
The party was launched on 28 February 2013, and officially registered on 3 April 2013. It put forward Modibo Sidibé as its candidate in the 2013 presidential elections. He finished fourth, with around 5% of the vote.

In the 2013 parliamentary elections it won six seats, becoming the fourth-largest party in the National Assembly.

References

Political parties in Mali
Political parties established in 2013